Ernest Charles Buley (1869–1933) was an Australian journalist and author.

His best selling book was entitled Glorious Deeds of Australasians in the Great War and went through many reprints.  The first edition was printed in October 1915 and was in its third edition by December.

Bibliography
 Australian Life in Town and Country, New York, 1905
 Glorious Deeds of Australasians in the Great War, Andrew Melrose, London, 1915
 A Child's History of ANZAC, Hodder and Staughton, London, 1916

References

Australian non-fiction writers
1869 births
1933 deaths